The DeSoto County Courthouse is an historic redbrick courthouse building located at 115 East Oak Street in  Arcadia, Florida. Designed by architects Bonfoey & Elliott of Tampa in the Classical Revival style, it was built in 1912-1913 by the Read-Parker Construction Company to serve as DeSoto County's third courthouse and the second one built in Arcadia. It was restored in 1976 and is a contributing property in the Arcadia Historic District.

The building was designed by the Tampa architectural firm of Bonfoey & Elliott. In 1989, the DeSoto County Courthouse was listed in A Guide to Florida's Historic Architecture, published by the University of Florida Press.

References

External links

 Florida's Historic Courthouses

Buildings and structures in DeSoto County, Florida
County courthouses in Florida
Historic district contributing properties in Florida
National Register of Historic Places in DeSoto County, Florida
Government buildings on the National Register of Historic Places in Florida
Government buildings completed in 1913
Neoclassical architecture in Florida
1913 establishments in Florida